Isaac Tanitoluwaloba Aduraoluwatimileyin Olaofe (born 21 November 1999) is an English professional footballer who plays for Stockport County, as a striker.

Career
Olaofe began his career with Millwall.

He moved on loan to Sutton United in February 2020. He made his debut on 22 February 2020 in a 2–2 home draw with Barrow, and scored his first goal in his final game for the club, a 1–1 draw with Hartlepool United on 14 Match 2020. He scored 1 goal in 5 league games for the club.

He moved on loan to Scottish club St Johnstone in July 2020, He said he was looking forward to working with St Johnstone manager Callum Davidson, who had previously been the assistant manager at Millwall. He made his debut for the club in a 0–3 defeat away at Rangers on 12 August 2020. On 5 October 2020, Olaofe returned to Millwall, having his loan terminated by mutual consent having only made two substitute appearances for the Scottish club.

Later that month he returned to Sutton United on loan. He scored his first goals back at the club with a hat-trick in a 5–1 defeat of King's Lynn Town on 14 November 2020. On 23 May 2021 in the penultimate match of the season, Olaofe scored his 14th of the season, the third in a 3–0 victory over Hartlepool United, a win that saw Sutton move 5 points clear of Torquay United with just one match remaining, meaning Sutton were crowned champions and promoted to the Football League for the first time in their history. Olaofe was Sutton's top scorer for the season (16 goals in all competitions) and won the Young Player of the Year award.

In June 2021, Olaofe signed a new contract with Millwall. He returned to Sutton United on loan on 31 August 2021.

On 30 December 2022, it was announced that Olaofe would join Stockport County once the transfer window opened on 1 January 2023, for an undisclosed fee.

Career statistics

Honours
Sutton United
 National League: 2020–21
EFL Trophy runner-up: 2021–22

Individual
 Sutton United Young Player of the Season: 2020–21

References

1999 births
Living people
English footballers
Millwall F.C. players
Sutton United F.C. players
St Johnstone F.C. players
Stockport County F.C. players
National League (English football) players
Scottish Professional Football League players
Association football forwards
Black British sportspeople
English Football League players